Ilya Vladislavovich Markov (born June 19, 1972 in Asbest, Russian SFSR) is a Russian race walker.

Achievements

References

1972 births
Living people
People from Asbest
Sportspeople from Sverdlovsk Oblast
Russian male racewalkers
Russian athletics coaches
Olympic male racewalkers
Olympic athletes of Russia
Olympic silver medalists for Russia
Olympic silver medalists in athletics (track and field)
Athletes (track and field) at the 1996 Summer Olympics
Athletes (track and field) at the 2000 Summer Olympics
Athletes (track and field) at the 2008 Summer Olympics
Medalists at the 1996 Summer Olympics
Universiade gold medalists in athletics (track and field)
Universiade gold medalists for Russia
Medalists at the 1997 Summer Universiade
Goodwill Games medalists in athletics
Competitors at the 1998 Goodwill Games
World Athletics Championships athletes for Russia
World Athletics Championships winners
World Athletics Championships medalists
European Athletics Championships winners
World Athletics U20 Championships winners
European Athletics Championships medalists
Russian Athletics Championships winners